"Öküz" Mehmed Pasha ("Mehmed Pasha the Ox"; died 23 December 1619), also known as Kara Mehmed Pasha ("the Black") or "Kul Kıran" Mehmed Pasha ("the Slavebreaker"), was an Ottoman statesman, administrator and military figure of the early 17th century who held the office of Grand Vizier twice, the first time from 17 October 1614 to 17 November 1616 (during the reign of Ahmed I) and the second time from 18 January 1619 to 23 December 1619 (during the reign of Osman II the Young). He was also governor of Egypt from 1607 to 1611. Okuz Mehmed's nickname "Kul Kiran" (slavebreaker) came from his success in crushing the mutiny in Egypt during the early 1600s (soldiers were often known as kul or slave).

Background
He was of Turkish origin and was born in Karagümrük district of Istanbul. It is reported that his father was an ox blacksmith. He was nicknamed "Black" and also given the nickname "Ox" by is enemies, based on the profession of his father. Before holding governmental positions, Mehmed Pasha had been a silahdar, a high-ranking position in the sultan's guard.

He married princess Gevherhan Sultan, the daughter of sultan Ahmed I and Kösem Sultan.

Governor of Egypt
Before his first term as grand vizier, Mehmed Pasha was appointed as governor of Egypt in 1607, a post he held until 1611. In 1604, three years before he assumed the office, the Governor of Ottoman Egypt Maktul Hacı Ibrahim Pasha was murdered by mutinying sipahi soldiers of his own troops. This event caused three years of instability in Egypt, with the subsequent two governors, Hadım Mehmed Pasha and Yemenli Hasan Pasha unable to completely quell the rebellion.

When Mehmed Pasha came into office, his strong-handed methods and personality allowed him to suppress the sipahis and abolish the illegal tulba protection tax they had been imposing on the Egyptian countryside. After first landing at Alexandria, he gathered public support by visiting the tombs of local saints and treating the Mamluks well, ordering repairs on Mamluk-built buildings and structures. He then proceeded to execute district governors who had allowed the sipahis to impose the tulba and warned others of the same fate.

Tensions came to a head in February 1609, when the rebels gathered in the city of Tanta and met at the tomb of Ahmad al-Badawi, Egypt's most popular saint, to swear that they would resist Mehmed Pasha's efforts; they then began to gather troops and pillage villages for supplies. Mehmed Pasha also gathered troops, although some of his officers suggested diplomacy, which Mehmed agreed to, sending a mufti named Altıparmak Mehmed Efendi and an officer to negotiate with the rebels. The mufti advised the rebels to give into "those in authority," and upon refusal, Mehmed Pasha's forces began to mobilize.

Mehmed Pasha's forces met the rebels just north of Cairo. The rebels, discouraged, lost the battle, and the pasha's forces summarily executed over 250 of them, while others were later exiled to Yemen.

In the aftermath of this event, Mehmed Pasha became known as Kul Kıran ("slavebreaker" in Turkish) for subjugating the Mamluks and the soldiers to Ottoman rule. He went on to promote public works and attempted to reform the fiscal and military organization of the Egypt eyalet, reducing the number of local beys to 12, although this measure was later abandoned. In 1611, he was recalled to the capital Constantinople by the sultan.

Grand Vizierates
Mehmed Pasha was grand vizier from 17 October 1614 to 17 November 1616, and again from 18 January 1619 to 23 December 1619. While in office, he was usually called Kara Mehmed Pasha, the nickname "ox" having been invented behind his back (although he almost certainly must have overheard it) by virtue of his heavy build and his father having been a blacksmith for cattle in the Karagümrük quarter of Constantinople. History retained this nickname rather than Kara, which means "black" in Turkish and which may refer to one's complexion or hair or, in the figurative, to courage and daring.

One episode during his time as grand vizier involved an attack on Vienna accompanied with only 47 raiders, and without having informed the sultan or any other authority in the Ottoman capital; it ended in complete failure and nearly cost him his head. Some historians consider his foray as a third siege of Vienna by the Ottoman Turks, alongside the better known incidences, undertaken first by sultan Süleyman the Magnificent in 1529 and later by grand vizier Kara Mustafa Pasha in 1683.

Governor of Aidin

In between his two terms as grand vizier, he held the office of governor of Aidin Vilayet (then a province covering a large part of western Anatolia), and his governorship is marked by the construction of a caravanserai in Kuşadası, named the Öküz Mehmed Pasha Caravanserai after him, aimed at attracting international trade through the port there (which shifted, in time, much more towards the port of İzmir upon the preference displayed by European merchants). The caravanserai in Kuşadası is used as a luxury hotel and shopping center today. He has had another solid caravanserai built in Ulukışla on the way to a campaign against the Safavids during the Ottoman–Safavid War (1603–18), which eventually ended with a decisive Ottoman defeat.

Death
He was strangled to death in office in 1619 by a young Janissary whose favors he had sought.

See also
 List of Ottoman Grand Viziers
 List of Ottoman governors of Egypt
 Öküz Mehmed Pasha Caravanserai

References

1619 deaths
Pashas
Civil servants from the Ottoman Empire
17th-century Grand Viziers of the Ottoman Empire
17th-century Ottoman governors of Egypt
Ottoman people of the Ottoman–Persian Wars
Turks from the Ottoman Empire
Ottoman governors of Egypt
Year of birth unknown
Damats